Srigufwara is an administrative sub division (tehsil) in Anantnag district of Indian union territory of Jammu and Kashmir. Srigufwara was given tehsil status by the government of Jammu and Kashmir on 1 February 2014.

Etymology
According to a legend, a famous Reshi meditated here in a cave in the 11th century AD when there was sparse human habitation in the area. His secret communion with God resulted in his salvation. It is believed that the name of the place comes from this saint's presence here. During Islamic rule it was called  (gof=cave, bal=place) again meaning place with a cave. The meaning of old Kashmiri name Srigufwara was distorted to make it seemingly Arabic.

Location
Srigufwara is located on the banks of one and the only tributary of the Lidder River, near several villages such as Khairbug, Poshkreedi, Darigund and Hugam. It is 19 kilometres away from the main city Anantnag.
Alternate route to famous health resort Pahalgam en route to famous Hindu Shrine Amarnath dedicated to the god Shiva, passes through Srigufwara. It serves as a short cut to travel to Pahalgam. The drive is via Apple valley, vast landscapes, and lush green fields.
Seventh century Martand sun temple on Martand plateau (Karewa) built by king Lalitaditya Muktapida of Kashmir is 10 kilometres away from Srigufwara.

New administrative unit
Local people and prominent political leaders have been demanding Tehsil status for the area from time to time. The decision for formation of new units was pending with the state government.
On 1 February 2014, Srigufwara was given Tehsil status in District Anantnag after Jammu Kashmir Chief Minister Omar Abdullah agreed to the proposal for the creation of new administrative units in the state. Srigufwara is one among 135 newly created Tehsils after state cabinet accept the report submitted by the Cabinet Sub Committee (CSC) headed by Deputy Chief Minister Jammu Kashmir Tara Chand.
The number of new administrative units recommended by CSC has been three times more than the Mushtaq Ganai Committee constituted by the Omar Abdullah government as it had recommended creation of only 57 Tehsils.

Srigufwara acts as a nerve center for more than 100 revenue villages, which form its catchments area and get benefit largely. Srigufwara is one among the few fast evolving towns of south Kashmir with an important role in rural economic distribution, development & activity.

Geography
Srigufwara is located at an elevation of 1684 meters above sea level. Lidder River passes through the town. It flows in a swift narrow stream from Sheeshnag lake to the east of Pahalgam. The Lidar passes through many villages. The area is abundant in small canals of different distances. There are minor rivers Mahind Canal and Dadi Canal, which serve the irrigation purpose in the area. Dadi canal initially covered less area but with remodeling the tail end irrigation has extended to 3,500 acres.

The Dadi Canal takes its water from the Lidder River at Kathsu near Chatapura. It is 19 kilometres long and irrigates about 8000 acres of land in Sakhras, Loiseer, Viddy, Darigund, Khiram, Bichhanpura and Sirhama. The Mahind Canal constructed in 1956 AD also takes it water from Lidder near village Sakhras. It is 16 kilometres long and irrigates about 2500 acres of land.

The area has deciduous vegetation and is abundant in coniferous forests including species like fir (Abies spectabilis), silver fir (Abies pindrow), kail (Pinus wallichiana), chir (Pinus roxburghii) and deodar (Cedrus deodara). There are numerous old chinar trees in the area particularly on roadsides. Other trees include willows and popular.  Forest provides timber while as grassy meadows in the forest provide fodder for the cattle.
Medicinal herbs such as digitalis, menthol, artemisia and belladonna, are also found in these forests.

The soils are loamy with little clay and lime content but with a high content of magnesia. Chemical fertilization, green manure and legume is used before cultivation. There is sufficient organic matter and nitrogen content in the alluvium because of plant residue, crops stubble, natural vegetation and animal excretion. Soils types include gurti (clay), bahil (loam) and sekil (sandy). Fruit cultivation is predominant slopes while paddy cultivation is common in planes.

The area has a temperate climate as Pir Panjal Range of minor Himalayas surrounds it. In winter, however, snowfall is heavier and temperature is relatively low. Due to the presence of mountains, monsoons have a negligible effect in the area. The rainfall is often excessive in spring, moderate in summer, deficient in autumn and moderate in winter.
Heavy rains and snowfall in winter poses a threat to the residential buildings in the area, which sometimes results in the collapse of the buildings.

Fauna and flora

Flora
Apple and walnut are the prominent fruits grown in the area. Apple season starts from mid-September and people sell the produce across various fruit markets in India especially the Jammu fruit market in the state itself. Apples pulp and juice are extracted for the production of jams and jellies.

There are different varieties of apples grown like, ambri Kashmir (amri), American trail (American apirogue), delicious (red delicious), maharaji (white dotted red) hazaratbali (benoni) kesri (cox orange pippin). Other Fruits like pears, cherries, plums, peaches, apricots and almonds are also grown. The fruits are mostly cultivated for economic purpose and little for local consumption.
Supply of machinery, equipment and technical advice to the fruit growers by the state government has greatly helped fruit cultivation. The training of gardeners has also made the fruit industry more efficient. The major shrubs are Indigofera heterantha, Viburnum spp., Sorbaria tomentosa etc. Ground cover is very rich and dicotyledonous herbs dominate: Rumex patientia, Primula spp., and anemone spp.

Fauna
Local forests are the abode of black bear, brown bear, leopard, rhesus macaque, grey langur, Himalayan mouse, hare and raven.

Overa Biosphere Reserve
The Overa-Aru Biosphere Reserve is 20 kilometres from the main town on Overa side. It has the status of a Wildlife sanctuary. It is famous for retaining several rare and endangered species like the hangul, musk deer, brown bear, leopard, monal and snow cock.

Economy
Agriculture and business are the main means of economy. This area is one of the major producers of fruit in Kashmir. Business sector is gaining prominence in the area and market economy is flourishing. And the town is developing at a greater pace.

During earlier times, people used to obtained silk from silk worms, which feed on mulberry trees. Pure silk was obtained from silk cocoons by rough means without any technical expertise. The practice of silk production is nonexistent now. Now the people are more engaged  with Apple and other business activities.srigufwara is one of the town in South Kashmir which is developing at faster pace in all aspects

Transport
The town has well-formed dual lane road connectivity with National Highway 1A which is 10 kilometres away from the main town. During summers the number of tourist vehicles increases considerably giving a boost to the local economy. Major portions of pilgrims to Amarnath Temple also pass through the area.

Demographics
The population mostly consists of Muslims belonging to the ethnic group Kashmiri believed to have migrated from Central Asia and Afghanistan. Gurjar (gujjar) and Bakarwal (Bakerwal) also present in the upper area (nomadic people who come from Rajouri and other areas of Jammu during summer, In general, they have nomadic character and largely depend on flocks and cattle keeping for their livelihood) . Most of the Gujjars are permanent settlers while as bakarwals stay in and around the area prior to their journeys to southern slopes of the Siwaliks and the Margs (Alpine-pastures) of the Central Himalayas.

Shrine of Zain-ud-Din Wali
The shrine of Sheikh Zain-ud-din wali who lived in the 15th century A.D is in the main town. Zainu Din was the disciple of Sheikh Noor-ud-din Wali, the leading Reshi of Kashmir. Various shrines are attributed to Zainu din Wali, including the famous shrine on a hillock in Ashmuqam about 20 kilometres from Pahalgam. However, the shrine in Srigufwara is important from the local belief that Zainu Din achieved spiritual perfection here.
It is commonly known in Kashmir that Sheikh Zain-ud-din, who was known by the name of Zia Singh before his conversion to Islam was a prince and belonged to the ruling Rajas of Kishtwar. His father Yesh Singh, the then Kishtwar ruler, is said to have been assassinated when Zia Singh was only 13 years old.
Zia Singh is believed to have been suffering from some disease. Once Sheikh Noor-ud-din Wali passed through Kishtwar and Zia Singh's mother knowing about the art of his spiritual healing urged him to cure his son. Sheikh agreed on the condition that the Zia will have to meet him in Kashmir. However, after his cure he forgot the promise and again went bedridden. Remembering her promise mother and son took journey to meet Noor-ud-din and met him at Bumzu. It was at this place that both Zia Singh and his mother embraced Islam under the names of Zain-ud-din and Zoon Ded respectively.
The exact date of the death of the saint is not known. However, his urs (anniversary) is celebrated on the 13th day of Basakh corresponding to 25 April. A torchlight procession, locally known as Zool (illumination), is held in the evenings during this festival. Pieces of forest wood especially deodar are tied to long wooden sticks and burnt. People of every age group participate in such processions.
The shrine of Zain-ud-din is respected by all communities and they actively participate in the celebration of the anniversary. There is no restriction to the entry into the shrine, which is open to visits by persons of either sex and of any community.

Government and politics
Srigufwara is one of the major areas of political interest in Anantnag. Different political leaders organize their rallies in the area on different occasions. Addressing a rally on  28 April 2013 in the premises of higher Secondary School Srigufwara Peoples Democratic Party’s (PDP) Mufti Mohammad Sayeed said that Jammu & Kashmir will become the most developed state in the region if it gets a visionary political road map and efficient governance.
Senior All Parties Hurriyat Conference (APHC), leader Shabir Ahmed Shah along with his companions Zahoor Ahmed Shairkh and Nazir Ahmed were arrested by Indian police on 7 July 2007. They were lodged at Srigufwara Police Station.
The Deputy Inspector General of Police (DIG), South Kashmir Range, S. A Watali presided over the Police Public meet in which grievances related to PHE, Consumer affairs and other similar departments were addressed.

Human rights
Srigufwara has witnessed protests against human rights violations in the area and across the valley from time to time. In the earlier days of militancy in Kashmir, a BSF camp of Indian military positioned here, which was later replaced by  Rashtriya Rifles (RR) forces.  CRPF camp is still functional in the area. An Eidgah, which was under military occupation, was also opened to public service after 20 years of military occupation.
In another incident a school headmaster Sonauaalh Ganie, of Bijbehara was taken up by 9 para commandoes of the camp and his relatives were not given access to meet him.
In the heyday of militancy in Kashmir (1996), people who were reluctant to vote were forced to vote in elections by Indian forces.

Education
The main area of Srigufwara has a total number of ten schools, out of which six are government and four are private ones. Among the government schools, there are three primary, two middle and one higher secondary while among private schools one is middle and three are high schools. Schools in the area include:

Government Model Higher Secondary School Srigufwara
Iqra English Medium High School viddy
Al-aman secondary school srigufwara 
National institute of creative education (NICE).
Qurat-ul-Ain English Medium School Srigufwara.

References

Cities and towns in Anantnag district